Clayton Kauzlaric is a game designer mostly known for the Xbox adventure game, Voodoo Vince and his work on the Total Annihilation real time strategy games. Kauzlaric was a founding member of Cavedog Entertainment and the founder of Beep Industries, a first party developer for Microsoft's Xbox.

He and Ron Gilbert co-created an episodic adventure game called DeathSpank, produced at Hothead Games in Vancouver, British Columbia. Kauzlaric also designed a number of downloadable casual games for RealArcade and Oberon Media. He is currently a Creative Director at Microsoft Game Studios.

References

External links
 Personal Blog

American bloggers
American video game designers
Year of birth missing (living people)
Living people